Indigo Sparke is an Australian indie rock musician from Sydney.

History
Sparke announced her debut album in 2020, with plans to release it the following year. In early 2021, Sparke signed to the label Sacred Bones Records. She released her album through the label on February 19. The album was co-produced by Adrianne Lenker (her partner at the time) and Andrew Sarlo, who had previously produced some of the Big Thief records.
In mid 2022, Sparke announced a new album, Hysteria, to be released through Sacred Bones on October 7. The album is produced by The National’s Aaron Dessner.

References

Musicians from Sydney
Year of birth missing (living people)
Living people